To the Hilt may refer to:

 To the Hilt (album), 1976 album by Golden Earring
 To the Hilt (song), 2016 song by Banks
 To the Hilt (film),  2014 Macedonian film